Ritual in Repeat is the third album by American indie pop band Tennis, released on September 9, 2014, on Communion Records. The album was produced by Patrick Carney, Jim Eno and Richard Swift.

Track listing

Personnel
Personnel adapted from Ritual in Repeat liner notes:

Tennis
Alaina Moore – vocals, keyboards, piano, guitar
Patrick Riley – guitar, bass guitar, keyboards, percussion
James Barone – drums, percussion

Additional musicians
Jim Eno – drums

Charts

References

2014 albums
Tennis (band) albums
Albums produced by Richard Swift (singer-songwriter)
Albums produced by Patrick Carney